The Kokopelli's Trail (also known as the Kokopelli Trail) is a  multi-use trail (but primarily used by mountain bikes) in Grand County, Utah and Mesa County, Colorado in the western United States. The trail was named in honor of its mythic muse, Kokopelli. The trail was created by the Colorado Plateau Mountain Bike Trail Association (COPMOBA) in cooperation with the Bureau of Land Management (BLM) and the United States Forest Service (USFS) in 1989.



Description

The Kokopelli's Trail begins near Loma, Colorado in the McInnis Canyons National Conservation Area. The trail follows Mary's Loop through the Mack Ridge mountain biking area before crossing Salt Creek and entering Rabbit Valley. From Rabbit Valley, the trail winds south roughly following the Colorado River until it crosses Utah State Route 128 and the river in Dewey, Utah, where it begins the uphill section, eventually looping around the La Sal Mountains, then descending into Moab, Utah, via the Porcupine Rim Trail.

The trail is widely varied in difficulty, terrain, and elevation. It has intense downhill sections and steep climbs, but several gently sloping road sections help to balance the trail and make it accessible to advanced and beginning mountain bikers alike. The terrain mostly consists of either single track, 4x4 roads, or country roads. The lush Colorado River valley is seen several times from high cliffs and the beautiful La Sal Mountains grow in size as riders continue on the trail.

There are eight small campsites along the trail, some of which require a fee. While each campsite has toilets, none have drinking water available and most do not provide shade. Because of a lack of drinking water on the trail, support vehicles must be used to meet riders at certain camping spots in order to replenish their water supply. The trail normally takes about 5 to 6 days to finish, but more advanced riders can do it in much less time. Riding season in the higher elevation (La Sal Mountains) is limited to mid-June through September, depending on the snowpack.

The trail descends into Moab, Utah, via Sand Flats Road, passing the Slickrock Trail. Riders may elect to finish via Porcupine Rim - and many do - although this is not the official end to the trail as mentioned in the above description.

On May 30, 2020, Australian biker, Lachlan Morton, set a new record for completing the trail. His time of 11 hour 14 minutes beat the previous record holder's (Kurt Refsnider) time of 11 hours 52 minutes. Following his ride Morton stated that he did not begin the ride planning on setting a new record on his trip from Moab to Loma, but after the ride went so well on the first section, he decided to push himself to toward the end.

See also

 American Discovery Trail
 Paradox Trail
 Colorado Plateau

References

External links

 Colorado Plateau Mountain Bike Trail Association
 BLM's McInnis Canyons National Conservation Area
 Rim Tours. Mountain Bike Tour Operator in Moab, Utah with expertise (great beta) regarding outfitting The Kokopelli Trail.
 Bikerpelli - A free guidebook for self-guided MTB tours
 
 

Bike paths in Utah
Bike paths in Colorado
Bureau of Land Management areas in Colorado
Protected areas of Grand County, Utah
Protected areas of Mesa County, Colorado
American Discovery Trail